Loskop Dam Nature Reserve is situated in northern Mpumalanga province, South Africa. The reserve covers approximately 22,850 ha, if the approximately 2,350 ha surface area of the reservoir is included. The Reserve is situated in the Olifants River valley, about 55 km north of Middelburg, and comprises a hilly bushveld region, centered on the Loskop reservoir.

Nature reserves in South Africa
Mpumalanga Provincial Parks